Brooks Crossroads, also called Brooks Cross Roads, is an unincorporated community in Yadkin County, North Carolina, United States on U.S. Highway 421, east of Interstate 77.

References

Unincorporated communities in North Carolina
Unincorporated communities in Yadkin County, North Carolina